Nyepi is a Balinese "Day of Silence" that is commemorated every Isakawarsa (Saka new year) according to the Balinese calendar (in 2023, it falls on March 22). It is a Balinese celebration mainly celebrated in Bali, Indonesia. Nyepi, a public holiday in Indonesia, is a day of silence, fasting and meditation for the Balinese. The day following Nyepi is also celebrated as New Year's Day. On this day, the youth of Bali in the village of Sesetan in South Bali practice the ceremony of Omed-omedan or 'The Kissing Ritual' to celebrate the new year. The same day is celebrated in India as Ugadi.

Observed from 6 a.m. until 6 a.m. the next morning, Nyepi is a day reserved for self-reflection, and as such, anything that might interfere with that purpose is restricted. The main restrictions are no lighting fires (and lights must be kept low); no working; no entertainment or pleasure; no traveling; and, for some, no talking or eating at all. The effect of these prohibitions is that Bali's usually bustling streets and roads are empty, there is little or no noise from TVs and radios, limited access to Internet and few signs of activity are seen even inside homes. The only people to be seen outdoors are the pecalang, traditional security men who patrol the streets to ensure the prohibitions are being followed.

Although Nyepi is primarily a Hindu holiday, non-Hindu residents and tourists are not exempt from the restrictions. Although they are free to do as they wish inside their hotels, no one is allowed onto the beaches or streets, and the only airport in Bali remains closed for the entire day. The only exceptions granted are for emergency vehicles responding to life-threatening conditions and women about to give birth.

On the day after Nyepi, known as Ngembak Geni (Relighting the Fire), social activity picks up again quickly, as families and friends gather to ask forgiveness from one another, and to perform certain religious rituals together. Fires and electricity are allowed again, and cooking of food resumes. Nyepi can be traced as far back as 78 A.D

Rituals 

 First, the Melasti Ritual is performed 3–4 days beforehand. It is dedicated to Sanghyang Widhi Wasa. The ritual is performed in Pura (Balinese temple) near the sea (Pura Segara) and meant to purify Arca, Pratima, and Pralingga (sacred objects) belonging to several temples, also to acquire sacred water from the sea.
 Second, the Bhuta Yajna Ritual is performed in order to vanquish the negative elements and create a balance with God, Mankind, and Nature. The ritual is also meant to appease Batara Kala by Pecaruan offering of live animal sacrifice. Around sunset the "Pengrupukan" ceremony begins in the house compounds with the noisy banging of pots and pans and bamboo tubes along with burning of dried coconut leaf torches to drive out the demons.

Most Hindu Balinese villages make Ogoh-ogoh, demonic statues made of richly painted bamboo, cloth, tinsel, and styrofoam symbolising negative elements or malevolent spirits or even characters from Hindu mythology. After the Ogoh-ogoh have been paraded around the village, they are burned in the cemeteries although many are displayed in front of community halls for another month or more and sometimes even purchased by museums and collectors.

 Third, the Nyepi Rituals are performed as follows:
 Amati Geni: No fire or light, including no electricity
 Amati Karya: No working
 Amati Lelunganan: No travelling
 Amati Lelanguan: No revelry/self-entertainment
 Fourth, the Yoga/Brata Ritual starts at 6:00 a.m. and continues to 6:00 a.m. the next day.
 Fifth, the Ngembak Agni/Labuh Brata Ritual is performed for all Hindus to forgive each other and to welcome the new days to come.
 Sixth and finally, the Dharma Shanti Rituals are performed after all the Nyepi rituals are finished.

Dates

Related festivals
Many Hindus in the Indian subcontinent observe the same day as new year. For example, the Hindus of Maharashtra term the same festival, observed on the same day, Gudi Padwa (Marathi: गुढी पाडवा). The Sindhis, people from Sindh, celebrate the same day as Cheti Chand, which is the beginning of their calendar year. Manipuris also celebrate their New Year as Sajibu Nongma Panba on the same day. The Hindus of  Andhra Pradesh and Karnataka also celebrate their new year on the same day as Ugadi.

Security
Security is provided by the usual hansip, while the pecalang are redirected into security roles from their usual mundane tasks like traffic coordination to beef up the local security. These two security forces report to local village heads, in 2017 it is reported islandwide that some 22,000 pecalang are taking part for Nyepi.  National police also take part, but naturally ultimately report to Jakarta rather than the village or regency level.

See also
 Indian New Year's days
 Gudi Padwa, celebrated in Maharashtra state of India on the same day as Nyepi. Gudi padwa (which marks new Chaitra month of new year) isn't celebrated on same day, for e.g. 2022 date is 2nd April
 Ugadi, celebrated in Telugu areas of India on the same day as Nyepi

References

External links 
 
 
 
 
 

March observances
New Year celebrations
Public holidays in Indonesia
Observances set by the Balinese saka calendar
Festivals in Indonesia
Silence